Javier Contreras may refer to:
 Javier Contreras (engineer)
 Javier Contreras (tennis)